The 2021 LPGA Tour was the 72nd edition of the LPGA Tour, a series of professional golf tournaments for elite female golfers from around the world. The season began at the Four Season Golf Club in Lake Buena Vista, Florida on January 21 and ended on November 21 at the Tiburón Golf Club in Naples, Florida. The tournaments were sanctioned by the United States-based Ladies Professional Golf Association (LPGA).

Schedule and results
The number in parentheses after each winners' name is the player's total number of wins in official money individual events on the LPGA Tour, including that event. Tournament and winner names in bold indicate LPGA majors. The schedule and purse amount for each tournament is listed on the LPGA website. The LPGA has a standard formula for payout percentages and distribution of its purse and prize money for every event. The winner typically gets 15% of the total, second place gets 9.3%, third place 6.75%, etc.

With the $1.3 million increase in the total prize fund for the 2021 Women's British Open from $4.5 million to $5.8 million announced on August 18, if all remaining events are played, the present 2021 total prize money is now scheduled to be $73.3 million, the largest in its history. With the  cancellation of the Toto Japan Classic, as the fifth canceled of the 35 originally scheduled, the total prize money to be won now drops to $69.2 million for the 30 played, $1 million fewer than in 2019. That 2019 total was $70.2 million in its 32 played tournaments. For 2021, the AIG Women's British Open has the largest total prize fund, but its winner's share of $870,000 is barely more than one-half of the CME Group Tour Championship that pays the winner $1.5 million, as it did in 2019, the largest ever in woman's golf.

Several events were postponed or canceled due to an ongoing COVID-19 pandemic.

Key

Unofficial events
The following event appears on the schedule, but does not carry official money.

Statistics leaders

Money list leaders

Source and complete list: LPGA official website.

Scoring average

Source and complete list: LPGA official website.

See also
2021 Ladies European Tour
2021 Symetra Tour

References

LPGA Tour seasons
LPGA Tour